The J. Anthony Lukas Work-in-Progress Award, established in 1999, is a literary award "given annually to aid in the completion of a significant work of nonfiction on a topic of American political or social concern." The prize is given by the Nieman Foundation and by the Columbia University School of Journalism and is intended to "assist in closing the gap between the time and money an author has and the time and money that finishing a book requires. 

Every year, one or two award winners receive an award of at least $25,000, and a finalist may receive a $5,000 award. Shortlisted books, introduced in 2016, receive no monetary award.

Recipients 
Titles listed below are the named titles in the J. Anthony Lukas Work-in-Progress Awards documents. Because the books are listed as in-progress, the book titles may have changed after publication. When applicable, the published book has been linked.

See also 

 J. Anthony Lukas Book Prize
 Mark Lynton History Prize

References 

English-language literary awards
Awards established in 1999
20th-century literary awards
21st-century literary awards